Delphinornis is an extinct genus of penguins that lived around the middle Eocene to the middle Miocene in Antarctica.

References

Spheniscidae
Prehistoric bird genera
Extinct penguins